The Lima Consensus are neoliberal, deregulatory, free market and far-right policies Peru adopted since the presidency of Alberto Fujimori that are supported by the nation's economic elite. The description of such policies as the "Lima Consensus" was credited to Harvard University government professor Steven Levitsky. Such policies have made Peru attractive for foreign portfolio investment, though has resulted with increased economic inequality, crime, corruption and poor labor rights. Those who support the Consensus are often free-market fundamentalists and view any economic interventionism as socialism or communism.

Background 
According to José Carlos Orihuela, the belief of limited state intervention held by the elite is due to frequent commodity booms, the weakness of the government, social disparities and the lack of national economists. The Government of Peru displayed little interference in the public sector throughout the nation's history since Peru frequently experienced commodities booms that benefitted white elites on the coast instead of the indigenous majority in rural areas, with businesses focusing on bringing commodities from inland Peru to export on the coast. The persistence of this model prevented development in Peru, hampered progressivism movements and made the establishment of a national economy impossible. Peru experienced limited government interaction in the public sector until 1968 when the military junta leadership of General Juan Velasco Alvarado began, with state capitalism and heavy spending instituted that resulted in large national debt. Political scandals resulted in the end of the junta and the Lost Decade of the 1980s began, with President Fernando Belaúnde Terry failing to develop an effective economic policy and his successor Alan García experienced the complete deterioration of the state due to corruption, hyperinflation and the internal conflict in Peru.

Plan Verde 

The Peruvian armed forces grew frustrated with the inability of the García administration to handle the nation's crises and began to draft a plan to overthrow his government. According to Peruvian sociologist and political analyst Fernando Rospigliosi, Peru's business elites held relationships with the military planners, with Rospigliosi writing that businesses "probably provided the economic ideas which [the military] agreed with, the necessity of a liberal economic program as well as the installment of an authoritarian government which would impose order". Thus, Plan Verde was drafted at the end of the García presidency; the objectives evolved into establishing a civilian-military government with a neoliberal economic policy, the genocide of impoverished and indigenous Peruvians in an effort to remove a drain on resources and the control or censorship of media.

During his campaigning for the 1990 Peruvian general election, Alberto Fujimori expressed concern against the proposed neoliberal policies of his opponent Mario Vargas Llosa and promised not to use shock therapy on Peru's economy. Peruvian magazine Oiga reported that following the election, the armed forces were unsure of Fujimori's willingness to fulfill their objectives outlined in Plan Verde and it was reported that they held a negotiatory meeting with him to ensure that Fujimori followed their direction. Fujimori would go on to adopt many of the policies outlined in Plan Verde.

Implementation 
The Lima Consensus as established by the Fujimori administration focused on deregulation and privatization with the goal of establishing a neoliberal economy. Fujimori and the Consensus experienced support as the public began to distrust left wing groups following the Velasco dictatorship and due to actions of communist guerrillas during the internal conflict. As the Fujimori government began to implement their economic policy, his administration attempted to rewrite Peru's economic history, with Minister of the Economy Carlos Boloña inaccurately stating "during the three decades that preceded to date, populist, socialist or mercantilist ideas and governments exercised almost absolute predominance in our country". Fujimori then instituted economic shock therapy policies described as "Fujishock"; Peru experienced macroeconomic stability though millions of Peruvians were instantly sent into poverty. The dismantling of political parties in the 1990s resulted with weaker newcoming politicians into the twenty first century since technocrats that existed in Fujimori's government would go on to promote the Consensus and dominate politics in Peru.

As the Washington Consensus lost popularity in the 2000s, a more defined Lima Consensus began to emerge in Peru simultaneously as the economy improved during the 2000s commodities boom. The economic boom Peru experienced did not develop a stronger government however, with deregulation and privatization becoming more established due to the Consensus following the fall of the Fujimori government while elites supporting the Consensus gained veto power in the government. Governments in the early twenty first century also prevented funding for social programs such as education, healthcare and poverty programs, with Peru spending much below the Latin American average. Alejandro Toledo continued to promote the decentralization of Peru, while the former social democrat Alan García took implementation of the consensus even further, adopting policies similar to Augusto Pinochet and combatting with indigenous groups opposed to mining in their communities, events culminating with the 2009 Peruvian political crisis that saw civilians against an oil development in the Amazon rainforest massacred. The Consensus effectively paralyzed the government of Ollanta Humala. Keiko Fujimori, the daughter of Alberto Fujimori, has been a major proponent for the Lima Consensus, utilizing the support of neoliberal economist Hernando de Soto to support her position during her elections. In 2020, the Congress of Peru refused to ratify the Escazú Agreement regarding environmental rights due to the beliefs surrounding the Lima Consensus, arguing that it would violate the sovereignty of Peru.

Following the 2021 Peruvian general election that saw leftist candidate Pedro Castillo elected into the presidency, Fitch Solutions warned that his election posed "substantial risks to the 'Lima Consensus', the investor-friendly economic policy framework that has persisted over the last 20 years".

Analysis 
The majority of the growth that occurred following the Lima Consensus occurred due to commodity booms, not due to deregulation and free trade. Consensus policies are supported by the economic elite and some of the middle class, with supporters advocating for deregulation, privatization and the removal of social programs. Successful Peruvian politicians often espouse center-left ideas while campaigning to gain the electoral majority and later turn to support the powerful right-wing elites after taking office.

This lack of state intervention as promoted by the Consensus has resulted with a weak government with poor performance, with many Peruvians experiencing insufficient basic services such as education, justice and security. The lack of state intervention has also resulted with the increase of corruption, crime, crony capitalism and inequality, with many political officials frequently moving between business and government positions without oversight. Regarding organization, Peru's weak government has also caused poor urban planning throughout the nation. The Consensus has also resulted with environmental degradation as businesses take advantage of deregulation in order to attain more growth. Such shortcomings of the government – promoted by the economic elite – result in a cycle of citizen dissatisfaction with the weak government while the government remains weak due to poor political support.

References

See also 

 Lima Group
 Madrid Charter
 Mercantilism
 Washington Consensus

Latin America
Commercial policy
Economic globalization
Neoliberalism
Neocolonialism